Melanthiaceae, also called the bunchflower family, is a family of flowering herbaceous perennial plants native to the Northern Hemisphere.  Along with many other lilioid monocots, early authors considered members of this family to belong to the family Liliaceae, in part because both their sepals and petals closely resemble each other and are often large and showy like those of lilies, while some more recent taxonomists have placed them in a family Trilliaceae. The most authoritative modern treatment, however, the APG III system of 2009 (unchanged from the 2003 APG II system and the 1998 APG system), places the family in the order Liliales, in the clade monocots. Circumscribed in this way, the family includes up to 17 genera.

Familiar members of the family include the genera Paris and Trillium.

Genera and species 
, the World Checklist of Selected Plant Families accepted 17 genera in the family. They have been divided into five tribes. It has a total of ca 173 known species. Generic assignments within the tribe Melanthieae in particular have been changed radically as a result of molecular phylogenetic studies in the 21st century. Some taxonomists have combined the three genera of Heloniadae into one genus (Helonias).

Heloniadeae
 Helonias L.
 Heloniopsis A.Gray
 Ypsilandra Franch.
Chionographideae
 Chamaelirium Willd.
 Chionographis Maxim.
Melanthieae
 Amianthium A.Gray
 Anticlea Kunth
 Melanthium J.Clayton ex L.
 Schoenocaulon A.Gray
 Stenanthium (A.Gray) Kunth
 Toxicoscordion Rydb.
 Veratrum L.
 Zigadenus Michx.
Xerophylleae
 Xerophyllum Michx.
Parideae
 Paris L. (including Daiswa and Kinugasa)
 Pseudotrillium S.B.Farmer
 Trillium L. (including Trillidium)

References

External links 

 Melanthiaceae  [in a very wide sense], Trilliaceae in L. Watson and M.J. Dallwitz (1992 onwards). The families of flowering plants: descriptions, illustrations, identification, information retrieval. Version: 3 May 2006. http://delta-intkey.com .
 links and more links at CSDL, Texas

 
Liliales families
Taxa named by August Batsch